The 2008 Speedcar Series was the inaugural Speedcar Series championship.  It consisted of four points-scoring race meetings, with a further non-championship round beforehand.  The Drivers' Championship was won by Johnny Herbert.

Teams and drivers
All of the teams used the Speedcar V8 vehicle with tyres supplied by Michelin.

Calendar

Championship Standings

Drivers

Points were awarded to the top eight classified finishers using the following structure:

Notes:
  – Driver did not finish the race, but was classified as he completed more than 90% of the race distance.

References

External links
Driver Database
The GEL Motorsport Information Page

Speedcar Series seasons
Speedcar Series season